Seung Chan Kim  (born April 15, 1991) is a South Korean medical scientist and inventor. His main area of research is biomagnetism [nonsensical translation]. He received the 2009 Talent Award of Korea along with Yuna Kim. He serves as World Talent Exchange and Sharing Organization president.

Career
Kim identified the cancer cell growth inhibition mechanism of magnetic-based cell division difference. Dispersed by the static magnetic field, the core protein GCP3 in spindle formation, during cell division cycle, was identified for the first time in the world. This contributed to establish the scientific basis on the availability to the magnetic field for future anti-cancer therapy. From Harvard MGH research exchanges, the treatment of nerve cell to nerve cell turning the magnetic field grow into the direction perpendicular to the magnetic field that can be used in a certain direction based on research data. These properties provide a basis for cell regeneration. In particular, in the case of spinal cord and nerve disorders due to a mismatch between synaptic connections, it is crucial. It developed for a first time as a patented technology uncovering a new era in medical science.

Currently he holds 163 intellectual patents. He graduated Yonsei University Department of Biotechnology. Talent sharing donations and volunteering was made through decisive contribution.

Based on the Korea Talent Association (대한민국인재연합회), he established the World TESO (World Talent Exchange and Sharing Organization) in the Philippines, Canada, and Australia. He also has a major contribution to enhancing the international status of contributions to the scientific talent exchange, with the Republic of Korea. In 2020, one of his COVID-19 patent KR-20200032050-A was cited by Gamaleya Research Institute of Epidemiology and Microbiology as a preliminary technology of Sputnik V COVID-19 vaccine.

He finished until senior year student in Yonsei University Medical School under the supervision of Hak-Joon Sung and Hui-Nam Pak. However, he was not accepted for graduation due to one subject incompletion in 2019. He then had to serve his military duties in South Korea. While his duties as a social service agent, he got a Ph.D. in healthcare management (Doctorate of Management Studies, DMS) at ISBM University in 2021. He was remotely accepted to All Saints University School of Medicine and a medical school at Ukraine to continue his studies. Kim works for human rights, medicine and education in World Talent Exchange and Sharing Organization with vice chairman Peter Park. He donates some of his technology to foster sustainable talent development.

Awards
 Talent Medal of Korea (or Talent Award of Korea, National President's Nominations)
 47th National Day Merit Award of the present invention (Patent Administration awards)
 49th day merit of the invention (Synedit companies, the Korea Invention Promotion Association Chairman award)
 Marquis Who's Who in the World

References

External links
 
 
 

1991 births
Living people
Yonsei University alumni
South Korean scientists
South Korean inventors